Antonio García (born 29 July 1964) is a Spanish fencer. He competed in the sabre events at five consecutive Olympic Games between 1984 and 2000.

See also
 List of athletes with the most appearances at Olympic Games

References

External links
 

1964 births
Living people
Spanish male sabre fencers
Olympic fencers of Spain
Fencers at the 1984 Summer Olympics
Fencers at the 1988 Summer Olympics
Fencers at the 1992 Summer Olympics
Fencers at the 1996 Summer Olympics
Fencers at the 2000 Summer Olympics
Fencers from Madrid